Kristoffer Skåne Grytnes (27 July 1887 – 22 July 1965) was a Norwegian politician for the Christian Democratic Party.

He was born in Horten.

He was elected to the Norwegian Parliament from Nordland in 1950, but was not re-elected in 1954.

Outside politics he worked as a school teacher in Grue, Horten, Drammen, Eidanger and Helgeland. He was a long-time member and deputy leader of the Diocese Council of Hålogaland.

References

1887 births
1965 deaths
People from Horten
Christian Democratic Party (Norway) politicians
Members of the Storting
Nordland politicians
20th-century Norwegian politicians